Now That's What I Call Music! 27 was released on March 11, 2008. The album is the 27th edition of the Now! series in the United States. It debuted at number two on the Billboard 200, although, with opening week sales at 169,000 units, it was the lowest opening week for a Now! album from the main series since the first volume.

Now! 27 features two Billboard Hot 100 number-one hits, "Kiss Kiss" and "No One", and has been certified Platinum by the RIAA.

Track listing

Charts

Weekly charts

Year-end charts

References

2008 compilation albums
 027
Sony BMG compilation albums